The 1915 Major League Baseball season was contested from April 10 to October 13, 1915.

The Federal League brought an antitrust lawsuit against the National and American Leagues prior to the 1915 season. The parties eventually reached a settlement and the Federal League disbanded after the season.

The Philadelphia Phillies and Boston Red Sox were the regular season champions of the National League and American League, respectively. The Red Sox then defeated the Phillies in the World Series, four games to one. Meanwhile, the Chicago Whales won the 1915 Federal League pennant.

Statistical leaders

Standings

American League

National League

Federal League

Postseason

Bracket

Managers

American League

National League

Federal League

Events
 May 6 – Babe Ruth of the Boston Red Sox hits the first of his career 714 home runs.

References

External links 
1915 Major League Baseball season schedule at Baseball Reference Retrieved January 14, 2018

 
Major League Baseball seasons